In physics, shear rate is the rate at which a progressive shearing deformation is applied to some material.

Simple shear
The shear rate for a fluid flowing between two parallel plates, one moving at a constant speed and the other one stationary (Couette flow), is defined by

where: 

 is the shear rate, measured in reciprocal seconds;
 is the velocity of the moving plate, measured in meters per second;
 is the distance between the two parallel plates, measured in meters.

Or:

For the simple shear case, it is just a gradient of velocity in a flowing material. The SI unit of measurement for shear rate is s−1, expressed as "reciprocal seconds" or "inverse seconds".

The shear rate at the inner wall of a Newtonian fluid flowing within a pipe is

where:

 is the shear rate, measured in reciprocal seconds;
 is the linear fluid velocity;
 is the inside diameter of the pipe.

The linear fluid velocity  is related to the volumetric flow rate  by

thus producing

Substituting the above into the earlier equation for the shear rate of a Newtonian fluid flowing within a pipe, and noting (in the denominator) that :

which simplifies to the following equivalent form for wall shear rate in terms of volumetric flow rate  and inner pipe radius :

For a Newtonian fluid wall, shear stress can be related to shear rate by  where  is the dynamic viscosity of the fluid. For non-Newtonian fluids, there are different constitutive laws depending on the fluid, which relates the stress tensor to the shear rate tensor.

References

Continuum mechanics
Temporal rates